A nautical measured mile is a nautical mile which is marked by two pairs of towers. A mile is measured by sailing on a given bearing and lining up the pairs of towers.  The start of the mile is recorded when the first pair of towers line up and the end of the mile recorded when the second pair line up.

To accurately measure performance ships must make at least four to six runs in both directions to allow for the wind and tide.    
                 
There are several nautical measured miles around the British Isles:
 Between Talland Bay and Hannafore, West Looe, Cornwall.
 At Skelmorlie, North Ayrshire, Scotland.
 There are four Admiralty Distance Poles at St Abb's Head, Berwickshire, Scotland.
 There are two consecutive miles on the Isle of Arran, Scotland between South Sannox and Corloch.

See also
Navigation transit markers

References

Navigation